Evolution Credit Limited, previously known as Real People Investment Holdings Limited, is a financial services holding company with its headquarters in Rosebank, South Africa.

Overview 
Evolution Group is a South African-based financial services institution. Its subsidiaries specialise in providing home improvement finance, debt collection services and assurance products. The group has more than 1,000 employees.

History 
Evolution Group was incorporated as Real People Group on 13 September 1999. On 21 August 2013 the company converted into a public limited liability company.

, the group has listed bonds on the NASDAQ OMX Stockholm.

Group Businesses 
The companies that compose the Real People Group include, but are not limited, to the following:

 DMC Debt Management (Proprietary) Limited – is a South African debt collection company, trading since 2001. The head office is situated in East London, South Africa.
Real People Home Finance (Proprietary) Limited - offers loans up to ZAR 120 000 for customers to spend at over 600 participating hardware stores. The head office is situated in Rosebank, South Africa.
Real People Assurance Company Limited – provides individual insurance policies. The head office is situated in East London, South Africa.

Governance 
Evolution Group is governed by a six-person board of directors, Norman Thomson as the chairperson and Neil Grobbelaar as the Group CEO.

See also 

Financial Services

References 

1999 establishments in South Africa
Financial services companies established in 1999
Financial services companies of South Africa
Companies based in Johannesburg
Microfinance organizations